Richard W. Hughes is an American gemologist and author, known as an authority on corundum, rubies and sapphires.

Career
A.G. graduate of Bangkok's AIGS (1980), and a Fellow of the Gemmological Association of Great Britain (F.G.A.) (1982). He was the director of the Asian Institute of Gemological Sciences in Bangkok, Thailand during the 1980s, and also served at the American Gem Trade Association’s gemological laboratories in California and New York from 2005 to 2008. In 1997 he authored Ruby & Sapphire, which is considered by many in the gem and jewelry industry to be the most authoritative treatise on the subject.

Hughes has authored or co-authored a number of books on gems as well as numerous articles on gemology over the past 34 years. In recognition of his contributions Hughes has received the American Gem Society's Richard T. Liddicoat Journalism Award in both 2004 and 2005.  In 2010 Hughes received The Antonio Bonanno Award for Excellence in Gemology.

Hughes has worked both in lab gemology and also in the wholesale, retail and mining sides of the gem business. He currently resides in Thailand with his Thai wife and daughter, where he is engaged in continued gemological research. In 2012 together with the family, he has established a Gemological laboratory in Bangkok called Lotus Gemology.

In 2010, Richard was awarded the prestigious Antonio C. Bonanno Award for Excellence in Gemology by the Accredited Gemologists Association.  This award recognizes Richard’s efforts in successfully advancing the profile of many gems and the countries that produce them through his travelogues, as well as more scientific writings and the generous sharing of this information through trade journals and his website. The award underscores the responsibility of the international gemological community to encourage and reward ongoing research, education and dissemination of information.

Books
Terra Spinel: Terra Firma, Yavorskyy, V. and Hughes, R.W. (2010). Yavorskyy Co., 202 pp., 
Ruby & Sapphire, Hughes, R.W. (1997) Boulder, CO, RWH Publishing, 512pp. 
Corundum, Hughes, R.W. (1990). Butterworth’s Gem Books, Northants, UK, Butterworth-Heinemann, 314 pp., 
The Book of Ruby & Sapphire, Halford-Watkins, J.F. & Hughes, R.W. (2012). RWH Publishing, 434 pp.,

See also
Gemology

References

External links
HW Diamonds
Web Site of R.W. Hughes

Gemologists
American expatriates in Thailand
Living people
Australian jewellers
Year of birth missing (living people)